Caroline Colvin was an American academic. She served as chair of the History Department at the University of Maine from 1906 to 1932, making her the first woman in the nation to a head major university department.

Biography
Colvin came to the university in 1902 at a time when the university, bolstered by its land grant institute status, was expanding its liberal arts programs to accompany its strong engineering and agricultural programs.

Colvin's tenure at the university was marked by a series of firsts. In addition to being the first woman in the nation to head a major university department, Dr. Colvin was also the first woman on the University of Maine faculty, the first woman to lead a University of Maine department, and the University's first dean of women.

As dean of women, Colvin advocated increased women's sports, and was a supporter of the Women's Student Government.  She was the first ever honorary member of the All Maine Women honor society.

Colvin is the namesake of Colvin Hall, a facility used by the University of Maine Honors College.  The facility houses both the Thomson Honors Center and a residence facility for Honors students. It was initially an all-women's dormitory where Dr. Colvin herself resided as House Mother. In the 1970s, it housed a campus co-op program where residents prepared their own meals until 1999, when it became the honors building.

Colvin continues to live on in University folklore. The Northeast Archives of Folklore at the university's Maine Folklife Center contains interviews of numerous people who attest to seeing a female ghost roaming the halls of Colvin Hall—some speculating it to be Colvin herself.

Sources
 "Dr. Caroline Colvin Honored," by Dr. Ava Harriet Chadbourne '15.  October 1930 issue of The Maine Alumnus 
 University of Maine Honors College—Colvin Hall 

University of Maine faculty
Historians of Maine
American women historians
Year of birth missing
Place of birth missing
Year of death missing